Luca Ferri (born 19 March 1980) is an Italian former footballer who played as a defender.

Career
Ferri started his professional career at A.S. Roma. He played his first Serie A match against Juventus on 21 March 1999, replaced Fabio Petruzzi in the 76th minute. The match ended in 1–1 draw. He also played the next match as Aldair's last minute substitute. He was loaned to Lecco in January 2000 and the club received 50 million Italian lire development bonus. In the summer of 2000, he was sold to Roma's sister club, Palermo, in a co-ownership deal (i.e. 50% rights), along with Attilio Nicodemo, for 300 million lire.

He won Serie C1 champion in 2001, and the duo was sold permanently for 5 billion lire (about €2.5 million). Palermo failed to promoted to Serie A in 2003 after 3 points short with the 4th and last promoted team Ancona. He was out favoured by new Palermo owner Maurizio Zamparini (since 2002) and in July 2003 left for league rival Ascoli along with Oscar Brevi. After Palermo won Serie A promotion, Ferri left for Serie C1 side Teramo.

In 2006, he left for Cisco Roma and played 3 seasons. In 2009–10 season, he left professional football and played for Zagarolo at Eccellenza Lazio (6th level).

Honours
Palermo
Serie C1: 2001

References

External links
 Profile at AIC.Football.it 
 

Italian footballers
Serie A players
Serie B players
A.S. Roma players
Calcio Lecco 1912 players
Palermo F.C. players
Ascoli Calcio 1898 F.C. players
S.S. Teramo Calcio players
Atletico Roma F.C. players
Association football defenders
Footballers from Rome
1980 births
Living people